Tommy Denison (born October 7, 1978) is the offensive coordinator for York University's football team, the York Lions of U Sports. As a former quarterback in Canadian Interuniversity Sport, he is a two-time All-Canadian and two-time winner of the Hec Crighton Trophy in 2002 and 2003. He played professionally for the Winnipeg Blue Bombers, Calgary Stampeders, and Toronto Argonauts of the Canadian Football League (CFL).

High school
Denison played his high school football at Beamsville District Secondary School, where he was a part of two Zone 4 championship football teams.

Great Lakes Football League
Denison played for the Niagara Colts of the GLFL and set numerous records including an 836-yard passing performance against the Brantford Bisons that was recognized in Sports Illustrated's Faces in the Crowd. He threw for 6,700 yards and 68 touchdowns in the 1998 season.

University career
Denison first attended Graceland College in 1998 where he was a member of the Graceland Yellowjackets. He then transferred to the Mansfield University of Pennsylvania in 1999, where he won the starting quarterback job midway through his redshirt freshman season. There he completed 68 of his 144 pass attempts for 735 yards with six touchdowns and ten interceptions.

Queen's University
In 2001, Dension returned to Canada and became a member of the Queen's Golden Gaels football team. In his first year, he initially split quarterbacking duties before starting the last four games of the regular season where he finished 6th nationally in passing yards with 1684 yards. 

In 2002, Denison set new standards for quarterback play and aerial offense. He became the first CIS football quarterback to pass for more than 3,000 yards in a single season. His 3,001 passing yards surpassed the old record set by Greg Vavra of the Calgary Dinos in 1983. The Gaels finished the 2002 season with a 7–1 record where Denison had 183 completions out of 312 attempts with 22 passing touchdowns. He recorded the most yards passing in a single OUA game on November 2, 2002 against the Western Mustangs in the OUA semifinal with 561 yards, which remains a U Sports playoff record as of 2019. He took the team to the Yates Cup where the Golden Gaels lost to the McMaster Marauders. For his record-setting season, Denison was awarded the Hec Crighton Trophy, becoming the second Golden Gael to win the award.

Denison continued his dominant play in 2003 as he completed 203 of his 313 passing attempts for 2,907 yards with a then-OUA-record 24 passing touchdowns. The Golden Gaels once again finished second in the OUA with a 7–1 record, but lost to the Wilfrid Laurier Golden Hawks in the semi-final playoff game. Nonetheless, based on another outstanding season, Denison was awarded his second consecutive Hec Crighton MVP award, becoming the second CIS quarterback to ever win the award more than once (Chris Flynn won the award three times). He finished his three-year CIS career with 7,592 passing yards, which was eighth all-time in CIS history, despite all seven players ahead of him having played five seasons. Denison was the central figure in the revival of Queen’s football program, helping to return a once proud program to the national scene.

Professional career
Since he began his collegiate career in 1998, Denison was eligible four year later for the 2002 CFL Draft, prior to his back-to-back Hec Crighton Trophy wins. As a result, he was undrafted and was able to sign with any professional team. On December 10, 2003, it was announced that he had signed with the Winnipeg Blue Bombers. He attended training camp with the Blue Bombers in 2004 and played in the first pre-season game against the Calgary Stampeders where he had four completions on six pass attempts for 46 yards. However, he was released by the team shortly thereafter.

On August 31, 2004, Denison was signed by the Calgary Stampeders. He dressed in one regular season game with the team in 2004 but spent the remainder of his term with the team on the practice roster. He was eventually released by the Stampeders and signed with the Toronto Argonauts, but did not play in a game and was released.

Denison was a member of the Albany Conquest in their 2005 season.

Northern Football Conference
Denison played for the Toronto Titans of the Northern Football Conference (a senior amateur league) from 2011 to 2012, and did not play in 2013. The club was re-named the GTA All-Stars and he re-joined to play for the team from 2014 to 2016.

Coaching career
While playing for the GTA All-Stars, Denison served as the team's offensive coordinator for four years and the team's head coach in his final year. With the experience, he was hired as the associate head coach (offense) and quarterbacks coach for the Saint Mary's Huskies in 2017. He then moved back to Ontario where he joined the Toronto Varsity Blues as the team's quarterbacks coach for the 2019 season.

On April 6, 2020, it was announced that Denison had joined the York Lions to serve as the team's offensive coordinator.

References

External links 
 York Lions bio

1978 births
Living people
Canadian players of Canadian football
Canadian football quarterbacks
Calgary Stampeders players
Queen's Golden Gaels football players
Mansfield Mounties football players
Toronto Varsity Blues football coaches
Saint Mary's Huskies football coaches
York Lions football coaches